Kaa is a fictional character in The Jungle Book.

Kaa or KAA may also refer to:

Arts and entertainment
 Kaa (1965 film), an Oriya film
 Kaa (2019 film), a Tamil thriller film

Business and organisations
 Kampala Associated Advocates, a law firm in Uganda 
 Kenya Airports Authority, the operator of civilian airports in Kenya
Kensington Aldridge Academy, a school in London, England
King Abdullah Academy, a Saudi Arabian international school in Virginia, U.S.
Korea Automobile Association

People
Hone Kaa (1941–2012), a New Zealand church leader
Keri Kaa, Hohi Ngapera Te Moana Keri Kaa, a New Zealand-born writer
Kaa Williams, a New Zealand television presenter
Dawson Charlie or K̲áa Goox̱ (c. 1865 – 1908), a Canadian First Nation person gold discoverer

Places
 Kaa, Duff Islands, an island in the Duff Islands, Solomon Islands
Kaa, Ghana, a community in Tolon District, Ghana
 Kasama Airport, Zambia, IATA code KAA

Other uses
 Karlsruhe Accurate Arithmetic, a special approach in floating-point arithmetics
 KAA Gent, a Belgian sports club 
 Karakalpak language, ISO 639-2 code: kaa
 Qa'a, also Ka'a, the last king of the First Dynasty of Egypt

See also

KAAA (disambiguation)
Kaas (disambiguation)
Kaja (name)